Jedediah Kimball (1810 - ?) was a farmer from Portland, Wisconsin (originally from Maine) who served a single one-year term in 1849 (the 2nd Wisconsin Legislature) as a member for the 4th Wisconsin State Assembly district (the Towns of Elba, Lowell, Portland and Clyman) from Dodge County. At the time of taking office (January 10, 1849), he was 38 years old, and had been in Wisconsin four years. He is believed to have been a Democrat; he succeeded Monroe Thompson, a Whig, and was succeeded by Democrat William T. Ward.

References 

Democratic Party members of the Wisconsin State Assembly
1810s births
19th-century American politicians
Year of death unknown
People from Portland, Dodge County, Wisconsin